The Trap (Spanish: La trampa) is a 1949 Argentine thriller film directed by Carlos Hugo Christensen and starring Zully Moreno, George Rigaud, and Juana Sujo. A woman marries a man without understanding the darker depths of his personality.

Cast
  Zully Moreno as Paulina Figueroa
  George Rigaud as Hugo Morán / Paul Deval
  Juana Sujo as Agatha Valle
  Carlos Thompson as Mario Casares
  Juan Corona as Dr. Vargas
  María Santos as Srta. Martín
  María Esther Buschiazzo as Josefina
  Arnoldo Chamot as Relator
  Raquel Notar as Presidenta de la Liga
  André Dumont as Extorsionador
  Mario Caraballo
  Gloria Ferrandiz as Sra. Salcedo

References

Bibliography 
 Rist, Peter H. Historical Dictionary of South American Cinema. Rowman & Littlefield, 2014.

External links 

1949 films
Argentine thriller films
1940s thriller films
1940s Spanish-language films
Films directed by Carlos Hugo Christensen
Films based on British novels
Argentine black-and-white films
1940s Argentine films